Hammersley is a surname. Notable people with the surname include:

Ben Hammersley (born 1976), British photojournalist
Charles E. Hammersley (died 1957), American politician
 Frederick Hammersley (1824–1901), Major-General and the first Inspector of Gymnasia in the British Army 
 Frederick Hammersley (1858-1924), British Army officer, commanded the Landing at Suvla Bay by his division during the Gallipoli Campaign
Frederick Hammersley (1919–2009), American abstract painter
James Astbury Hammersley (1815–1869), English painter, and teacher of art and design
John Hammersley (1920–2004), British mathematician
Martyn Hammersley (born 1949) British sociologist
Peter Hammersley (1928–2020), British admiral
Rachel Hammersley (born 1974) British historian
Rodolfo Hammersley (born 1889, date of death unknown), Chilean track and field athlete
Samuel Hammersley (1892–1965), Conservative Party politician in England 
William Hammersley (1826–1886), sports journalist in Australia

See also 
Hammersley Inlet, part of Puget Sound in Washington, USA
Hammersley Wild Area, in Pennsylvania, USA
Hammersley Fork, also in Pennsylvania, USA
Hamersley (disambiguation)